Eleanor McCutcheon Davis (born January 16, 1983) is an American cartoonist and illustrator.

Early life
Eleanor Davis was raised in Tucson, Arizona by comic-enthusiast parents who exposed her to stories like Little Lulu, Krazy Kat, Little Nemo, and the Kinder Kids. She attended Kino School, an alternative K-12 school in Tucson. In high school, she began drawing seriously and self-published her own comic. She studied sequential art at the Savannah College of Art and Design in Georgia.

Career
Davis has self-published many comics, including The Beast Mother.

Davis's work has also been included in five issues of Fantagraphics' anthology MOME as well as Houghton Mifflin's Best American Comics in 2008.

Her easy-reader book, Stinky, was published in 2008 by Françoise Mouly's Toon Books and won an ALA Geisel Honor Award, a Booklist's Notable Children's Books Award, and the Bank Street College of Education's Best Children's Books of the Year in 2009 as well as the Association for Library Service to Children's Graphic Novels Reading List award in 2014. The Secret Science Alliance and the Copycat Crook, published by Bloomsbury Children's in 2009, was a collaborative book created with husband Drew Weing, who inked Davis' illustrations. In 2009, she won the Eisner's Russ Manning Most Promising Newcomer Award and was named one of Print magazine's New Visual Artists. In 2013, her short story In Our Eden received a gold medal from the Society of Illustrators.

In August 2014, Fantagraphics published Davis' first collection of stories How to Be Happy. Slate described the collection: "a mix of evocative, geometric watercolors and fluid pen-and-ink cartoons, How to Be Happy tells stories of sad people, lonely people, strong people, confident people, all trying to find a tiny bit of happiness in life." Upon publication, comics critic Richard Bruton described Davis as "without question, a major young creator."

Her 2017 graphic novel You & a Bike & a Road, published by Koyama Press, won the Ignatz Award for Outstanding Anthology or Collection.

In March 2018, Fantagraphics published Why Art?, a graphic novel in which Davis examines the concept of art. Her most recent graphic novel, The Hard Tomorrow, published by Drawn and Quarterly, was released in October 2019.

Davis has taught comic book storytelling summer classes at the University of Georgia.

Personal life
Davis lives and works in Athens, Georgia, with fellow cartoonist and husband Drew Weing.

Selected works
 Stinky. Toon Books. (2008) 
 The Secret Science Alliance and the Copycat Crook. (2009) Bloomsbury. .
 How to Be Happy. Fantagraphics. (2014) .
 You & a Bike & a Road. Koyama Press. (2017) .
 Why Art? Fantagraphics. (2018) .
The Hard Tomorrow. Drawn and Quarterly. (2019) .

References

External links
 
 
 "Talking Comics with Tim: Eleanor Davis on How to Be Happy" (June 30, 2014) by Tim O'Shea, Comic Book Resources (CBR.org, archived 2015-09-05)

1983 births
Living people
American women cartoonists
American women illustrators
Alternative cartoonists
American female comics artists
Female comics writers
American cartoonists
21st-century American women